Shakers For You is the second studio album by Uruguayan rock band Los Shakers. It was released in October 1966 on the Odeon Pops label.

Track list

Personnel
 Hugo Fattoruso – lead vocals (except where noted below), lead guitar, piano, organ, percussion
 Osvaldo Fattoruso – backing vocals, rhythm guitar, percussion
 Roberto "Pelín" Capobianco – backing vocals, bass guitar, percussion, lead vocals on "Diles (Tell Them)"
 Carlos "Caio" Vila – backing vocals, drums, percussion

References

External links

1966 albums
Los Shakers albums